Grant Township is a township in Dade County, in the U.S. state of Missouri.

Grant Township has the name of Ulysses S. Grant, a Civil War officer, and afterward President of the United States.

References

Townships in Missouri
Townships in Dade County, Missouri